Red Nose Day 2007 was a fund raising event in England organized by Comic Relief, broadcast live on BBC One and BBC Two from the evening of 16 March 2007 to early the following morning. It was part of "The Big One" campaign. Presenters introduced the show in two-halves, one titled 'The funny' and the other titled 'The money'.

Presenters

Donation progress

16 March 2007
 7:25pm - £2,256,037
 8:19pm - £7,430,542 (£2,000,136 raised by TK Maxx selling Red Nose Day T-shirts in store)
 9:09pm - £15,139,826 (£1,001,219 raised by Walkers WalkEars)
 9:48pm - £22,148,068 (£7,008,242 raised by Sainsbury's)
 9:54pm - £26,820,554
 11:30pm - £27,420,554 (£600,000 raised by BBC Radio 1)
 11:31pm - £27,771,803 (£351,249 raised by Müller)
 11:52pm - £34,269,843

17 March 2007
 12:39am - £34,346,177 (£76,334 from Andrex)
 1:35am - £38,157,240
 3:03am - £40,236,142

Appeals

Sketches

Musical performances

The show

Top Gear of the Pops

Features

Comic Relief Does Fame Academy

Live final presented by Patrick Kielty and Claudia Winkleman with judges Craig Revel Horwood, Lesley Garrett and Richard Park and featuring Tricia Penrose singing "If I Ain't Got You" and Tara Palmer-Tomkinson - "These Boots Are Made for Walkin'".

Comic Relief Does The Apprentice

Alan Sugar decides which celebrity apprentice is not raising enough money for Comic Relief and fires them.

Comic Relief Does Beat The Boss
School children design a suit for Lenny Henry to wear whilst presenting tonight's show.

Top Gear of the Pops

Jeremy Clarkson, Richard Hammond and James May present their own Top Gear take on the axed chart show Top of the Pops, featuring performances from Lethal Bizzle, McFly, Travis and Supergrass, while the boys discuss "News" on various musical topics, and perform as a band for Justin Hawkins in the closing number.

Pimp My Red Nose Ride
Tim Westwood presents a special edition of Pimp My Ride in which he visits an old people's home in Staffordshire and then pimps their dishevelled 12-year-old LDV community transport bus. The finished bus came complete with waterproof seating, a walking stick rack and an onboard bingo hall.

Stash of Celebrity Swag
Justin Lee Collins and Alan Carr raid a celebrity's mansion in an updated version of Through the Keyhole and steal some of their belongings. Viewers can call in to win the bag of swag if they can guess, from the really obvious clues, who the swag belongs too. This phone-in competition was later subject to an investigation in which it was revealed the winner was faked. After the first two genuine callers got the answer wrong the queue was lost. After a delay the third caller and subsequent winner was faked by a crew member.

In the lead up to Red Nose Day many different fund raising events occurred:
 Beginning Friday 9 March 2007, the BBC Radio 1 breakfast team staged a tour around the UK entitled The Chris Moyles Rallyoke. The tour involved seven Karaoke nights held in a well known UK location featuring members of the public and well known celebrities and music artists. Most Radio 1 shows report on their progress, and hold competitions to win tickets to be at the final on Red Nose Day, and also to win the contents of a truck donated by various celebrities. As well as raising money at each event, the profit of the phone-in competitions go to Comic Relief making a total of £600,000
 Televised events included a third series of Comic Relief Does Fame Academy, and a celebrity version of The Apprentice entitled Comic Relief Does The Apprentice has also been screened. Also a special hybrid of Top of the Pops and Top Gear titled Top Gear of the Pops was made for Red Nose Day. It featured its presenters Jeremy Clarkson, Richard Hammond and James May singing with Justin Hawkins, as well as Top Gear segments such as The Cool Wall.
 Fund raising merchandise sold during the 2007 campaign included the Big One (Red Nose) itself, 'Walkears', an Andrex Puppy with a red nose, a special Little Britain Live DVD and the official single, which was a cover of Aerosmith's 'Walk This Way' sung by Girls Aloud and Sugababes.
The last episode of the Vicar of Dibley was aired as part of the show, starring the usual cast. It featured Sting taking part with a celebrity and non-entity television show, swapping wives with the vicar's husband Harry.
The special Little Britain Live featured famous people such as: Dennis Waterman, Chris Moyles, Jonathan Ross, Kate Moss and Russell Brand. Kate Moss played a chav, Russell Brand played a transvestite, and both Chris Moyles and Jonathan Ross were brought on as either small parts, or people who came up to the audience to be embarrassed.
There were several sketches from Catherine Tate: in which David Tennant (who she would work with again a year later in Doctor Who, which is referenced to & joked about within the sketch) became a school teacher; Daniel Craig fell in love with Tate; mouthy teenager Lauren was given work experience at 10 Downing Street, leading to Tony Blair using her catchphrase "Am I bovvered?"; and foul-mouthed "Nan" appeared with Noel Edmonds on Deal or No Deal.
To gain additional money, Peter Kay and Matt Lucas released a cover of The Proclaimers hit, I'm Gonna Be, and released it as a single 'I Would Roll (500 Miles)' (both were playing characters who used wheelchairs from Little Britain and Phoenix Nights).  It also featured numerous celebrity guests.
There was also a live show from The Mighty Boosh.

Cast & reporters

 Ant & Dec
 Billy Connolly
 Ewan McGregor
 Annie Lennox
 Davina McCall
 Fearne Cotton
 Emma Thompson
 Catherine Tate
 Peter Kay
 Daniel Craig
 Richard Hammond
 Jeremy Clarkson
 James May
 Justin Hawkins
 Jamie Oliver
 Bob Geldof
 Ricky Gervais
 Stephen Merchant

 Sting
 Bono
 Tony Blair
 Rowan Atkinson
 Michelle Ryan
 Sacha Baron Cohen
 Carol Vorderman
 Johnny Ball
 Noel Edmonds
 Andrew Lloyd Webber
 David Tennant
 Elle Macpherson
 Dawn French
 Dick and Dom
 Gary Barlow
 Matt Lucas
 David Walliams
 Chris Moyles
 Russell Brand

References

External links
 BBC Red Nose Day Page
 Red Nose Day Official Website
 

Red Nose Day
2007 in British television
2007 in the United Kingdom
March 2007 events in Europe